Friendship Academy, Shreveport (FA) was a school on the west side of Shreveport (Caddo Parish), Louisiana with classes K-12.  It operated from 1970 until 1985; and was one of several small schools of its type in the Shreveport-Bossier area and throughout Louisiana during that period.

History 
1969  Friendship Baptist Church School on Winderweedle Road west of Shreveport, Louisiana.
1970 West Shreveport Academy (WSA) was founded by a group of families from the west side of Shreveport.
1971 WSA and Friendship Academy merged.
1971 First varsity girls and boys basketball teams
1973 First varsity football team 
1985 Friendship Academy closed.
Much of FA's history is documented in Eyrie, the school's yearbook which was published annually during the school's existence.

Facilities 
The campus was located at 6808 Jefferson Paige Road on the west side of Shreveport where the main classroom, library and administrative building was substantially completed in 1970; a detached cafeteria was erected soon after immediately behind the main building.  Ground was broken for the gymnasium in the spring of 1972 and it was completed prior to the beginning of classes that fall; it housed a new cafeteria along with boys and girls dressing and locker rooms, coaches' offices and other athletic and physical education facilities, the old cafeteria was converted into a science and biology laboratory. Falcon Field was completed in the fall of 1974 in time for FA to host its first home football game. The 73-74 football season games were played at State Fair Stadium Independence Stadium.

Extracurricular 
Friendship Academy students competed in literary rallies, speech tournaments and debates across the state.

FA won the designation as "President" school at the 74-75 LISA (Louisiana Independent School Association) Student Council Convention giving FA the honor of hosting the 75-76 statewide Council Convention March 27–29, 1976;
The school was also represented at The Louisiana Regional and National Science Fair under the guidance of teacher Hal Meekins.

The school fielded athletic teams at the high school, middle school and elementary school level, Football, girls and boys basketball, girls and boys track and field, girls and boys tennis, boys baseball, girls softball, gymnastics, golf; The teams competed in District 1-A of  LISA (Louisiana Independent School Association).  Boys athletic teams were known as the Falcons while some girls teams were the Lady Falcons; uniform colors were combinations of blue, gold and/or white, and often displayed the silhouette of the Falcon mascot.

A Sports Wall of Fame was established in 1979 on a wall of the gymnasium.  The wall featured student athletes who were outstanding in their individual sports. The criteria for members was to be an all state selection and be offered a college scholarship in their sport. Nine athletes listed below earned the honor from 1979 through the school's closing.

1979 Brent Belton All State Golf, Shreveport Amateur Champion, Centenary College,  East Ridge Country Club Amateur champion

1980 Mike Hicks All State Basketball, Louisiana basketball All Star 1981, LSU Dirty Dozen top prospects, College of The Ozarks

1980 Suzanne Linn All State Basketball, Panola College

1983 Leslie Nelson All State Basketball, 1984 Louisiana All Star Game,

1982 Doug Doyal All State Football, State Champion Long Jump 1983, Northwestern State University

1982 Eric Brakefield All State Basketball,1983 Louisiana All State Basketball, 1984 Louisiana All Star Game, Bossier Parish College

1982 Michael Moore All State Football, 1983 All State Football, 1984 Louisiana All Star Football Game, 1984 Track Champion 200 meters, Triple Jump, La. Tech

1982 David Bolen Second Team All State Football

1979 Mark Brown Track Champion 200 meters, 400 meters, 800, meters, Southland Conference indoor Champion 400 meters Louisiana Tech

1980 Dean Mayfield Golf state championship team and Centenary College

1975 - 1976 Willie Wood Golf All state (transferred after sophomore year) United States amateur champion, Oklahoma State University, and PGA tour

References 

Ruston Daily Leader, Louisiana All Star Game 1984. 
Shreveport Times All City  football 1984, football recruiting 1983
Shreveport Journal  Football Recruiting Class for Area Colleges 1982, 1983

Defunct schools in Louisiana
High schools in Shreveport, Louisiana